Monj-e Olya (also Romanized as Monj-e ‘Olyā; also known as Monj-e Bālā and Qal‘eh-ye Bālā) is a village in Sarvestan Rural District, in the Central District of Bavanat County, Fars Province, Iran. At the 2006 census, its population was 736, in 201 families.

References 

Populated places in Bavanat County